Kannedhirey Thondrinal is a 2022 Indian Tamil-language television series airing on Kalaignar TV. It stars Swetha Khelge, Malavika Avinash and Jayshri Jue in lead roles. It premiered on 27 June 2022.

It tells a story of a Sakthi, a village belle, who is a biological daughter of Rudhra but has been raised by her security guard, Rathnam, without her knowledge. This series was launched along with Ponni C/O Rani.

Plot
The story about Rudra, a woman who comes from a wealthy family, hires Rathnam as her driver. On the day of the birth of both their children, An malevolent Rathnam switches his newborn baby for hers in secret to get revenge on Rudra and provide his child a life of luxury. 

After switching them, however, The two girls grow-up in different ways. Sakthi, raised at Rathnam's house, is timid, innocent, and soft-spoken, while Anitha, who is raised at Rudra's house, is Arogant. The story tell what happens, when truth come out.

Cast

Main cast
 Malavika Avinash as Rudhra
 Swetha Khelge as Sakthi
 Jayshri Jue as Anitha

Recurring cast
 Jeevan G Vaa as Shiva
 Kavitha Solairaja as Indhumathi
 Kovai Babu as Manivannan	
 Vaishu Jayachandhiran	
 Tejas Gowda	
 Ranjit Konety as Arun
 Som Soumyan / Ramachandran Mahalingam as Rathnam
 Shwetha B as Seetha Rathnam

Special Appearances 
 Subathra as Aparna
 Vadivukkarasi as Abhirami

Production

Development 
The shooting of this serial commenced in March 2022. The first promo was released on 11 May 2022.

Casting  
Swetha Khelge was cast in the female lead role as Sakthi, making her comeback to Tamil Television after a small hiatus. Malavika Avinash and Jayshri Jue were cast as the next main leads. This marks Malavika's return to Tamil television after a hiatus of 9 years. Jeevan G Vaa was cast in the male lead role as Shiva, by marking his debut in Tamil Television Network.

References

External links
 Kannedhirey Thondrinal at Kalaignar TV Youtube

Kalaignar TV television series
2022 Tamil-language television series debuts
Tamil-language television shows
Television shows set in Tamil Nadu
Tamil-language melodrama television series